Moges Alemayehu (born 6 December 1948) is an Ethiopian long-distance runner. He competed in the marathon at the 1980 Summer Olympics.

References

External links

1948 births
Living people
Athletes (track and field) at the 1980 Summer Olympics
Ethiopian male long-distance runners
Ethiopian male marathon runners
Olympic athletes of Ethiopia
Place of birth missing (living people)